Liberty Hill may refer to the following places in the U.S. state of Alabama:
Liberty Hill, Cleburne County, Alabama
Liberty Hill, Etowah County, Alabama
Liberty Hill, Franklin County, Alabama
Liberty Hill, Jackson County, Alabama
Liberty Hill, Talladega County, Alabama